The men's team class 9-10 table tennis event was part of the table tennis programme at the 2012 Summer Paralympics in London. The event took place from Wednesday 5 September to Saturday 8 September.

Bracket
The draw for team events took place on 28 August 2012.

Results

First round

Quarter-finals

Semi-finals

Finals
Gold medal match

Bronze medal match

References

See also
Table tennis at the 2012 Summer Paralympics

MT09-10